Australia and New Zealand share many dishes due to similar colonial ties and shared publications such as the Women's Weekly.

Main dishes

Breakfast

Salads

Dips

Breads

Sandwiches

Savoury pastries

Deep fried snacks

Fast food, pub meals

Baked/grilled/fried dishes

Stewed/boiled dishes

Sausages

Sweet dishes

Sweet breads

Sweet pastries

Sweet slices

Cakes

Puddings

Other sweets

Chocolate and lollies

Biscuits

Other

Ingredients/products

Beverages

Hot beverages

Cold beverages

Alcoholic beverages

References

 
New Zealand cuisine
Dishes